Young, Gifted and Yellow is a compilation album by Yellowman, released originally in the United Kingdom on 22 April 2013, and subsequently in other European countries in the following days by VP Records. It features rarities, outtakes and live performances from the period 1970–84, including songs with Fathead and Sister Nancy. It contains "Zunga Zeng", which is commonly known as the most popular song by Yellowman.

The album was released individually in numerous European countries, including a bonus DVD of a live-performance of Yellowman at the Reggae Sunsplash in 1988.

Content
The album includes material from Yellowman from his albums Mister Yellowman, Nobody Move, and more. Spanning two discs, 40 songs all-together from his prime years, the production company remastered the tracks before release.

Track listing

CD 1

CD 2

References 

2013 compilation albums
Yellowman albums